This is a sortable summary of the pages Timeline of volcanism on Earth, List of Quaternary volcanic eruptions, and Large volume volcanic eruptions in the Basin and Range Province. Uncertainties as to dates and tephra volumes are not restated, and references are not repeated. Volcanic explosivity index (VEI) values for events in the Miocene epoch sometimes lack references. They are given as VEI-equivalent, as an estimate of the erupted tephra volume. This is not a comprehensive list.

List

References

Bibliography 
 
 Supplementary Table I: 
 Supplementary Table II:

Further reading 

Volcano Global Risk Identification and Analysis Project Website 

Volcanic eruptions
 
Cenozoic volcanism